Rakitovo is a town in the Pazardzhik Province, Bulgaria.  the population is 8 952. It is located in the northern part of the Rhodopi mountains at 12 km to the east of Velingrad and 7 km to the southwest of the Batak Reservoir. There is timber industry in the town. People from the region grow crops, lavender, potatoes and barley.

Some Aromanians live in Rakitovo.

International relations

Twin towns — Sister cities
Rakitovo is twinned with:

  Svetlograd, Russia

References 

Towns in Bulgaria
Cities and towns in the Rhodopes
Populated places in Pazardzhik Province
Aromanian settlements in Bulgaria